Well-known text (WKT) is a text markup language for representing vector geometry objects. A binary equivalent, known as well-known binary (WKB), is used to transfer and store the same information in a more compact form convenient for computer processing but that is not human-readable. The formats were originally defined by the Open Geospatial Consortium (OGC) and described in their Simple Feature Access.  The current standard definition is in the ISO/IEC 13249-3:2016 standard.

Geometric objects
WKT can represent the following distinct geometric objects:
Point, MultiPoint
LineString, MultiLineString
Polygon, MultiPolygon, Triangle
PolyhedralSurface
TIN (Triangulated irregular network)
GeometryCollection

Coordinates for geometries may be 2D (x, y), 3D (x, y, z), 4D (x, y, z, m) with an m value that is part of a linear referencing system or 2D with an m value (x, y, m). Three-dimensional geometries are designated by a "Z" after the geometry type and geometries with a linear referencing system have an "M" after the geometry type.  Empty geometries that contain no coordinates can be specified by using the symbol EMPTY after the type name.

WKT geometries are used throughout OGC specifications and are present in applications that implement these specifications. For example, PostGIS contains functions that can convert geometries to and from a WKT representation, making them human readable.

The OGC standard definition requires a polygon to be topologically closed. It also states that if the exterior linear ring of a polygon is defined in a counterclockwise direction, then it will be seen from the "top". Any interior linear rings should be defined in opposite fashion compared to the exterior ring, in this case, clockwise.

The following are some other examples of geometric WKT strings: (Note: Each item below is an individual geometry.)
GEOMETRYCOLLECTION(POINT(4 6),LINESTRING(4 6,7 10))
POINT ZM (1 1 5 60)
POINT M (1 1 80)
POINT EMPTY
MULTIPOLYGON EMPTY
TRIANGLE((0 0 0,0 1 0,1 1 0,0 0 0))
TIN (((0 0 0, 0 0 1, 0 1 0, 0 0 0)), ((0 0 0, 0 1 0, 1 1 0, 0 0 0)))
POLYHEDRALSURFACE Z ( PATCHES
    ((0 0 0, 0 1 0, 1 1 0, 1 0 0, 0 0 0)),
    ((0 0 0, 0 1 0, 0 1 1, 0 0 1, 0 0 0)),
    ((0 0 0, 1 0 0, 1 0 1, 0 0 1, 0 0 0)),
    ((1 1 1, 1 0 1, 0 0 1, 0 1 1, 1 1 1)),
    ((1 1 1, 1 0 1, 1 0 0, 1 1 0, 1 1 1)),
    ((1 1 1, 1 1 0, 0 1 0, 0 1 1, 1 1 1))
  )

Well-known binary
Well-known binary (WKB) representations are typically shown in hexadecimal strings.

The first byte indicates the byte order for the data:
 00 : big endian
 01 : little endian

The next 4 bytes are a 32-bit unsigned integer for the geometry type, as described below:

Each data type has a unique data structure, such as the number of points or linear rings, followed by coordinates in 64-bit double numbers.

For example, the geometry POINT(2.0 4.0) is represented as: 000000000140000000000000004010000000000000, where:
 1-byte integer 00 or 0: big endian
 4-byte integer 00000001 or 1: POINT (2D)
 8-byte float 4000000000000000 or 2.0: x-coordinate
 8-byte float 4010000000000000 or 4.0: y-coordinate

Format variations
 EWKT and EWKB – Extended Well-Known Text/Binary  A PostGIS-specific format that includes the spatial reference system identifier (SRID) and up to 4 ordinate values (XYZM). For example: SRID=4326;POINT(-44.3 60.1) to locate a longitude/latitude coordinate using the WGS 84 reference coordinate system. It also supports circular curves, following elements named (but not fully defined) within the original WKT: CircularString, CompoundCurve, CurvePolygon and CompoundSurface.
 AGF Text – Autodesk Geometry Format  An extension to OGC's Standard (at the time), to include curved elements; most notably used in MapGuide.

See also
Simple Features
Geography Markup Language
Well-known text representation of coordinate reference systems

References

External links
Simple Feature Access Specification
ISO Spatial standard (there is a charge for this)
BNF Notation of WKT 
EBNF Notation of WKT
Online conversion between geometry objects representations

GIS file formats
Markup languages

de:Well Known Text